Buchholz is a village and a former municipality in the district of Nordhausen, in Thuringia, Germany. Since July 2018, it is part of the town Nordhausen.

References

Former municipalities in Thuringia
Nordhausen (district)